Hamelia is a genus of flowering plants in the coffee family, Rubiaceae. The name honors French botanist Henri-Louis Duhamel du Monceau (1700–1782).

Selected species
 Hamelia axillaris Sw. – Guayabo Negro
 Hamelia cuprea Griseb.
 Hamelia macrantha Little
 Hamelia papillosa Urb. (Jamaica)
 Hamelia patens Jacq. – Firebush (American tropics and subtropics)
Hamelia patens var. glabra Oerst.
Hamelia patens var. patens

References

External links

 
Rubiaceae genera
Taxonomy articles created by Polbot